Hakim Sar-Temsoury (born 6 March 1981 in Brive-la-Gaillarde) is a French football player.

Formerly a youth player of Nantes, in 2000 he signed for Hibernian, claiming that the presence of Franck Sauzee was a major factor in his decision to join the club. Alex McLeish, the manager, gave him one appearance in the SPL, a 2–0 win against Motherwell in September 2000. Sar-Temsoury also appeared as a substitute in two Scottish League Cup ties that season. He left the club at the end of the season and joined ESA Brive in the CFA 2.

References

External links 

French footballers
French expatriate footballers
Expatriate footballers in Scotland
Scottish Premier League players
FC Nantes players
Hibernian F.C. players
Limoges FC players
1981 births
Living people
ESA Brive players
People from Brive-la-Gaillarde
Association football forwards
Sportspeople from Corrèze
Footballers from Nouvelle-Aquitaine